Tasty is the second solo album released by recording artist Patti LaBelle, her second solo album with Epic Records. Compared to the success of her debut album, released the previous year, the album performed only modestly well but featured the popular tunes "Eyes in the Back of My Head", which became a club hit, the Latin soul flavored "Teach Me Tonight (Me Gusta Tu Baile)", the David Lasley composition "I See Home" (covered a year later by Tina Turner) and the ballad "Little Girls". "Eyes in the Back of My Head" became an international hit reaching the top five of the Italian singles chart. The album also featured covers of songs by Boz Scaggs, The Drifters and Roy Hamilton in addition to a couple songs co-written by LaBelle herself, including "Teach Me Tonight" and "Quiet Time".

Track listing
"Save the Last Dance for Me" (Doc Pomus, Mort Shuman) - 5:05
"Monkey See Monkey Do" (Michael Franks) - 5:12
"Little Girls" (Allee Willis) - 6:46
"You Make It Hard to Say No" (Boz Scaggs) - 5:35
"Teach Me Tonight (Me Gusta Tu Baile)" (Armstead Edwards, James R. Budd Ellison, LaBelle) - 5:21
"Quiet Time" (Armstead Edwards, James R. Budd Ellison, LaBelle) - 5:05
"Don't Let Go" (Jesse Stone) - 4:06
"I See Home" (Allee Willis, David Lasley) - 5:57
"Eyes in the Back of My Head" (Pete Wingfield) - 5:25

2014 remaster
10. "Teach Me Tonight (Me Gusta Tu Baile)" [Single Version] - 3:26
11. "Little Girls" [Single Version] - 3:58
12. "Eyes in the Back of My Head" [12" Disco Version] - 8:00
13. "Save the Last Dance for Me"  [12" Disco Version] - 7:14

Personnel 
 Patti LaBelle – lead vocals, musical direction, vocal arrangements, backing vocals (5)
 James Budd Ellison – keyboards, musical direction, vocal arrangements
 Richard Kermode – acoustic piano (5)
 Leo Nocentelli – guitars 
 Ray Parker Jr. – guitars 
 Wah Wah Watson – guitars 
 Eddie N. Watkins Jr. – bass (1-4, 6-9)
 Pablo Tellez – bass (5)
 Ollie E. Brown – drums (1)
 James Gadson – drums (2-4, 6-9)
 Leon "Ndugu" Chancler – drums (5)
 Andy Narell – steel drums
 Raul Rekow – congas (1, 2)
 Sheila Escovedo – timbales (5)
 Dale Warren – orchestral arrangements and conductor (3, 8)
 Teresa Adams – orchestra direction (3, 8)
 Nathan Rubin – concertmaster (3, 8)
 Al Bent – brass arrangements (4, 5)
 David Rubinson – arrangements, vocal arrangements
 The Waters [Julia, Luther, Maxine and Oren Waters] – backing vocals (1-4, 7–9)
 Carlos Alomar – backing vocals (5)
 Willie Colón – backing vocals (5)
 The Johnny Land Singers – backing vocals (6)

Production 
 David Rubinson – producer, engineer 
 Fred Catero – engineer
 Chris Minto – assistant engineer 
 Cheryl Ward – assistant engineer
 Tony Lane – art direction, design 
 Weldon Andersen – back cover photography 
 Benno Friedman – front cover photography 
 George Annis – music copyist 
 Vicki Gray – music copyist 
 Tony Kaye – music copyist

2014 Reissue Credits 
 Wayne A. Dickson – producer, additional remastering
 Michal L. Bednarek – associate producer
 Malcolm McKenzie – associate producer 
 Christian John Wikane – associate producer 
 Nick Robbins – remastering

Charts
Album chart usages for Billboard200
Album chart usages for BillboardRandBHipHop

References

1978 albums
Patti LaBelle albums
Albums produced by Dave Rubinson
Epic Records albums